Gordon R. "Bud" Bradley (July 9, 1921 – January 18, 2011) was an American politician and farmer who served as a member of the Wisconsin State Assembly.

Biography
Bradley was born in Utica, Winnebago County, Wisconsin. He graduated from Omro High School in Omro, Wisconsin before participating in a one-year agriculture program at the University of Wisconsin–Madison.

Bradley was first elected to the Wisconsin State Assembly in 1968 and served until 1988. Additionally, he was Town Clerk and Town Supervisor of Oshkosh, Wisconsin from 1967 to 1971. He was a Republican.

He died on January 18, 2011.

References

People from Utica, Winnebago County, Wisconsin
Republican Party members of the Wisconsin State Assembly
City and town clerks
University of Wisconsin–Madison College of Agricultural and Life Sciences alumni
1921 births
2011 deaths